Glaucostola maroniensis is a moth of the family Erebidae first described by James John Joicey and George Talbot in 1918. It is found in French Guiana, Brazil and Venezuela.

References

Phaegopterina
Moths described in 1918